John Prie (died 1727) was a minor pirate in the Caribbean.

History

In 1727 Prie and some associates staged a mutiny aboard the Dutch-flagged ship Young Lawrence during a cruise in the West Indies.  Prie murdered the Captain and declared himself Master of the ship.  The mutineers were caught and tried in London.  Prie tried to frame fellow sailor John Ashley for the murder, who responded with a profanity-laced tirade.  Prie was convicted for both murder and piracy and sentenced to hang. He was hanged at Execution Dock, then gibbeted in chains opposite the town of Woolwich in July 1727.

See also
Admiralty court – The trial court which condemned Prie.

References

Year of birth missing
18th-century pirates
British pirates
People executed for piracy
1727 deaths
Caribbean pirates